The Symphonia is an ancient musical instrument.

Symphonia may also refer to:
Symphonia (plant), a plant genus of the family Clusiaceae
Symphonia (moth), a moth genus of the family Crambidae
Symphonia (theology), a Byzantine theory of church-state relations
Symphonia (record label), an Italian classical record label
Tales of Symphonia, a 2003 Japanese role-playing game for the GameCube
a fictional kingdom in the manga and anime series Rave Master

See also

Sinfonia (disambiguation)
Symphony (disambiguation)

Genus disambiguation pages